Paraplatyptilia xylopsamma is a moth of the family Pterophoridae that is found in the United States in Colorado, Utah and California.

The head is light yellow-ocherous sprinkled with whitish. The antennae are whitish-ocherous, with a dark fuscous line above. The thorax is brownish-ocherous sprinkled with whitish and the abdomen is whitish-ocherous, faintly streaked with brownish. The forewings are brownish-ocherous, slightly sprinkled with whitish, although the dorsal half is suffused with pale whitish-ocherous from the base to the cleft. The hindwings are ferruginous-fuscous.

References

Moths described in 1908
xylopsamma
Endemic fauna of the United States
Moths of North America